Luri may refer to:

 Luri people or Lurs, an Iranian people
 Luri language, Western Iranian language continuum spoken by the Lurs
 Luri language (Nigeria), dialect of the Afro-Asiatic language Polci
 Luri, Haute-Corse, commune in France
 Luri (river), coastal stream in the department of Haute-Corse, Corsica, France
 Andrew Luri, Sudanese-Australian actor
 Diego Luri (born 1985), Brazilian actor, singer and journalist

See also
Lurs (disambiguation)
Lari (disambiguation)
Lurie, a Jewish surname